Gordon Blaine Moskowitz (born October 6, 1963) is a social psychologist working in the field of social cognition.  He is currently a professor in the Department of Psychology at Lehigh University.  His primary research interests are in examining: 1) social inferences which occur with neither the intention of forming an impression nor the awareness that one has done so (i.e., the extent to which social inferences, especially stereotypes, are spontaneous); and 2) the non-conscious nature of motivation and goals, with emphasis on how the goals to be egalitarian and creative are more efficiently pursued when one is not consciously trying to pursue them. This work has been applied to the question of how stereotypes impact medical diagnosis and treatment and contribute to health disparities, as well as to how medical training can implement what is known about controlling stereotyping and prejudice to reduce such bias and minimize health disparities.

Biography
Moskowitz was born in Brooklyn, New York to Howard and Geraldine Moskowitz.  He attended McGill University (B.Sc. 1984) and New York University (Ph.D. 1993). His post-doctoral training was at the Max Planck Institute on Leopoldstrasse in Munich, Germany. From 1994 through 2001 he was an assistant professor of psychology at Princeton University.

Research topics
 the nature of stereotyping and the question of how people can prevent stereotypic thoughts from occurring or, if they do occur, prevent stereotypic thinking from influencing their evaluations of and actions toward others.
 the "snap judgments" made when hearing about, meeting, or observing others; the "automaticity" of human inferential processes and the extent to which goals and motives can be equally "automatic."
 the manner in which goals, operating outside of conscious awareness, control cognition, such as 1) egalitarian goals inhibiting one's stereotypes, and 2) creativity goals inhibiting typical thoughts in favor of more atypical and unique ones.
 the extent to which people are persuaded or influenced by minority messengers: the cognitive economy which directs initial thoughts toward minorities and how motives which instigate more elaborate thought processes lead to greater minority influence.
 a motive termed "the need for structure" and how the desire to control, understand, and structure the events and people which make up one's social world affects the way in which one perceives and acts.

Publications

Books
 Moskowitz, G.B., & Grant, H. (Eds., 2009). The Psychology of Goals. New York, NY: Guilford Press.
 Moskowitz, G.B.  Social Cognition: Understanding Self and Others.  NY, NY: The Guilford Press, 2005.
 Moskowitz, G.B. (Ed., 2001). Cognitive Social Psychology: The Princeton symposium on the legacy and future of social cognition. Hillsdale, NJ: Erlbaum.

Journal articles
 Moskowitz, G.B., Stone, J., & Childs, A. (2012). "Implicit Stereotyping and Medical Decisions: Unconscious Stereotype Activation in Practitioners’ Thoughts About African Americans". American Journal of Public Health.
 Stone, J., & Moskowitz, G.B. (2011). "Nonconscious racial bias in medical decision-making: What can be done to avoid it?" Medical Education, 45, 768–776.
 Moskowitz, G.B., & Li, P. (2011). "Egalitarian Goals Trigger Stereotype Inhibition: A Proactive Form of Stereotype Control". Journal of Experimental Social Psychology, 47(1), 103–116.
 Moskowitz, G.B.(2010). "On the Control Over Stereotype Activation and Stereotype Inhibition". Social and Personality Psychology Compass, 4 (2), 140–158.
 Galinsky, A.D., & Moskowitz, G.B. (2007). "Further ironies of suppression: Stereotype and counter-stereotype accessibility". Journal of Experimental Social Psychology, 42, 833–841.
 Sassenberg, K. & Moskowitz, G.B. (2005). "Do not stereotype, think different! Overcoming automatic stereotype activation by mindset priming". Journal of Experimental Social Psychology, 41 (5), 317–413.
 Moskowitz, G.B., Li, P., & Kirk, E. (2004). The implicit volition model: On the preconscious regulation of temporarily adopted goals. In M. Zanna (Ed.), Advances in Experimental Social Psychology (Volume 36, pp. 317–413). San Diego, CA: Academic Press.
 Moskowitz, G.B., Salomon, A.R., & Taylor, C.M. (2000). "Preconsciously controlling stereotyping: Implicitly activated egalitarian goals prevent the activation of stereotypes."  Social Cognition, 18, 151–177.
 Moskowitz, G.B., Gollwitzer, P.M., Wasel, W., & Schaal, B. (1999).  "Preconscious control of stereotype activation through chronic egalitarian goals."  Journal of Personality and Social Psychology, 77, 167-184
 Thompson, E.P., Roman, R.J., Moskowitz, G.B., Chaiken, S., & Bargh, J.A. (1994).  "Accuracy motivation attenuates covert priming effects: The systematic reprocessing of social information."  Journal of Personality and Social Psychology, 66, 474–489.

Other
 Moskowitz, G.B. (2012). The Representation and Regulation of Goals. In A. Elliot, & H. Aarts (Eds.), Goal-Directed Behavior. New York: Psychology Press/Taylor and Francis.
 Moskowitz, G.B., & Li, P. (2010). Implicit Control of Stereotype Activation. In Hassin, R., Ochsner, K. and Trope, Y. (Eds.), Self Control in society, mind, and brain (pp. 354– 374). London: Oxford University Press. 
 Moskowitz, G.B. (2009). Goal Priming. In G.B. Moskowitz, & H. Grant (Eds.), The Psychology of Goals (203-233). New York: The Guilford Press.
 Andersen, S.A., Moskowitz, G.B., Blair, I.V., & Nosek, B.A. (2007). Automatic Thought. In E.T. Higgins & A. Kruglanski (Eds.) Social Psychology: Handbook of Basic Principles (Volume 2).  New York: Guilford.
 Moskowitz, G. B., & Chaiken, S. (2001)  "Mediators of minority social influence: Cognitive processing mechanisms revealed through a persuasion paradigm."  In N. de Vries & C. de Dreu (Eds.), Group innovation. Fundamental and applied perspectives.  Oxford, Blackwell.
 Moskowitz, G.B., Skurnik, I., & Galinsky, A. (1999). "The history of dual process notions; The future of preconscious control."  In S. Chaiken and Y. Trope (Eds.), Dual Process Models in Social Psychology (pp. 12–36). New York: Guilford.
 Gollwitzer, P.M., & Moskowitz, G.B. (1996). "Goal effects on action and cognition."  In E.T. Higgins & A. Kruglanski (Eds.) Social Psychology: Handbook of Basic Principles (pp. 361–399). New York: Guilford.
 Uleman, J.S., Newman, L.S., & Moskowitz, G.B. (1996).  "People as flexible interpreters: Evidence and issues from spontaneous trait inference."  In M. Zanna (Ed.), Advances in Experimental Social Psychology, 28, 211–280. San Diego, CA: Academic Press.

References 
 Gordon Moskowitz professional profile
 Lehigh University faculty page
 Rate My Professor Page

21st-century American psychologists
Jewish American scientists
Social psychologists
New York University alumni
Princeton University faculty
Lehigh University faculty
1963 births
Living people
21st-century American Jews
20th-century American psychologists